David Hare (March 10, 1917 – December 21, 1992) was an American artist, associated with the Surrealist movement. He is primarily known for his sculpture, though he also worked extensively in photography and painting. The VVV Surrealism Magazine was first published and edited by Hare in 1942.

Early life and education
Born March 10, 1917 in New York City, New York to father Meredith Hare, a lawyer and mother Elizabeth Sage Goodwin, an art collector. In the 1920s the family moved first to Santa Fe, New Mexico and later to Colorado Springs, Colorado, in hope that the fresh air would help heal Meredith Hare's tuberculosis. His mother founded the Fountain Valley School, where David attended high school. After high school Hare married and moved to Roxbury, Connecticut where he worked as a color photographer.

He attended Bard College in Annandale-on-Hudson from 1936 to 1937, studying biology and chemistry.

In the late 1930s, with no previous artistic training, he began to experiment with color photography. Using his previous education in chemistry Hare developed an automatist technique called "heatage" in which he heated the unfixed negative from an 8 by 10-inch plate, causing the image to ripple and distort.

Career 
Hare's Surrealist experiments in photography were only one of his many projects. In 1938 he met Susanna Winslow Wilson and the couple soon married. Both David and Susanna pursued their interests in Surrealism and regularly attended Surrealist gatherings in New York Larre French restaurant on 56th street and at Breton's Greenwich Village apartment. In 1940 he received a commission from the American Museum of Natural History to document the Pueblo Indians of the American Southwest, for which he eventually produced 20 prints developed using Eastman Kodak's then-new dye transfer process (a time-consuming and complicated technique). In the same year, he also opened his own commercial photography studio in New York City and exhibited his photographs in a solo show at the Julien Levy Gallery.

In the next few years, through his cousin the painter Kay Sage, he came into contact with a number of Surrealist artists who had fled their native Europe because of World War II. Hare became closely involved with the émigré Surrealist movement and collaborated closely with them on projects such as the Surrealist journal VVV, which he cofounded and edited from 1941 to 1944 with André Breton, Max Ernst, and Marcel Duchamp. David and Susanna divorce in 1945 and Breton’s wife Jacqueline Lamba left Andre for Hare. Breton wrote a book of poems titled How To Protect Young Cherry Trees From Hares that was illustrated by Arshile Gorky, in lamentation.

Hare began to experiment with Surrealist sculpture, which soon became his primary focus, and exhibited his work as solo shows in a number of prestigious venues, including Peggy Guggenheim's The Art of This Century gallery.

In 1948, Hare, Barnett Newman, William Baziotes, Mark Rothko and Robert Motherwell founded the Subjects of the Artist School at 35 East 8th Street. Well attended lectures there were open to the public, with speakers such as Jean Arp, John Cage and Ad Reinhardt, but the art school failed financially and closed in the spring of 1949. Hare continued to be closely associated with influential artists and thinkers throughout the late 1940s and 1950s, counting Jean-Paul Sartre, Balthus, Alberto Giacometti, and Pablo Picasso among his friends and acquaintances. He belonged to the early generation of New York School Abstract Expressionist artists whose artistic innovation by the 1950s had been recognized across the Atlantic, including Paris. He participated from 1954 to 1957 in the invitational New York Painting and Sculpture Annuals. These Annuals were important because the participants were chosen by the artists themselves.

During the 1960s and 1970s Hare held teaching positions at several different schools, including the Philadelphia College of Art. During this period, he began work on his Cronus series of sculpture, paintings, and drawings, which became the subject of a solo show at New York's Guggenheim Museum in 1977. Marcel Duchamp was Hare’s best man at David’s third marriage, to photographer Denise Browne.

Death and legacy 
He died on December 21, 1992 in Jackson, Wyoming, after an emergency operation for an aortic aneurysm.

He was included in many Surrealist retrospectives, primarily represented by his sculpture and painting.

References

Further reading

Catalogs which include Hare
 Reuniting an Era abstract expressionists of the 1950s, Exhibition: Nov. 12, 2004-Jan. 25, 2005, Rockford Art Museum, Rockford, IL
 The Third Dimension Sculpture of the New York School, by Lisa Phillips, Exhibition circ.: December 6, 1984 – March 3, 1985 The Whitney Museum of American Art, New York 
 American Painting of the 1970s, essay by Linda L. Cathcart, Exhibition circ.:December 8, 1978 – January 14, 1979 Albright-Knox Art Gallery, Buffalo, New York
 200 Years of American Sculpture, Bicentennial Exhibition: March 16-September 26, 1976, organized by the Whitney Museum of American Art, New York, David R. Godine, Publisher in association with the Whitney Museum of American Art  HC

Books
 Marika Herskovic, American Abstract Expressionism of the 1950s An Illustrated Survey, (New York School Press, 2003.) . pp. 158–161
 The Annual & Biennial Exhibition Record of the Whitney Museum of American Art 1918-1989. Incorporating the serial exhibitions of The Whitney Studio Club, 1918–1928; The Whitney Studio Club Galleries, 1928–1930; The Whitney Museum of American Art, 1932–1989, ed. by Peter Falk, Sound View Press, 1991 
 New York Cultural Capital of the World 1940-1965 ed. Leonard Wallock, Rizzoli, New York 1988 
 American Sculpture in Process: 1930/1970 by Wayne Andersen, New York Graphic Society Boston, Massachusetts, Little, Brown and Company Publisher, 1975 
 American Art of the 20th Century by Sam Hunter and John Jacobus, Harry N. Abrams, Inc., New York, 1973 
 American Art Since 1900 A Critical History by Barbara Rose, Frederick A. Praeger, Publishers, New York, Washington 1967 Library of Congress Card Catalog Number 67-20743
 Modern Sculpture from the Joseph H. Hirshhorn Collection, The Solomon R. Guggenheim Museum, New York, 1962 Library of Congress Card Catalog Number 62-19719
 The Sculpture of this Century by Michel Seuphor, Gorge Braziller Inc., New York, 1960 Library of Congress Card Catalog Number 60-7807
 Sculpture of the Twentieth Century by Andrew Carnduff Ritchie, The Museum of Modern Art, New York, Thames & Hudson, Ltd., London, December, 1952.
 Welded Sculpture of the Twentieth Century by Judy Collischan, The Neuberger Museum of Art, New York, Hudson Hills Press, New York, 2000 .
Hadler, Mona “David Hare, Surrealism, and the Comics,” The Space Between: Literature and Culture, 1914-1945, VII: 1, (December 2011),  93-108.
 SHAPE OF THINGS, by David Hare 
Texts by Uwe Goldenstein and Philippe Rey, English, 23 × 30.5 cm, 56 pages, 40 color and black & white plates, wrap around softcover 
Kodoji Press, Baden 2021, ISBN 978-3-03747-104-3

External links
 Artcyclopedia - Links to Hare's works
 davidhareart.com - Comprehensive website with photographs of his work.

1917 births
1992 deaths
Deaths from aortic aneurysm
20th-century American painters
American male painters
Abstract expressionist artists
Modern painters
People associated with the American Museum of Natural History
University of the Arts (Philadelphia) faculty
American surrealist artists
20th-century American sculptors
20th-century American male artists
American male sculptors